A cease and desist letter is a document sent to an individual or business to stop alleged illegal activity. The phrase "cease and desist" is a legal doublet, made up of two near-synonyms.  The letter may warn that, if the recipient does not discontinue specified conduct, or take certain actions, by deadlines set in the letter, that party, i.e., the letter's recipient, may be sued. When issued by a public authority, a cease and desist letter, being "a warning of impending judicial enforcement", is most appropriately called a "cease and desist order".

Usage for intellectual property

Although cease and desist letters are not exclusively used in the area of intellectual property, particularly in regards to copyright infringement, such letters "are frequently utilized in disputes concerning intellectual property and represent an important feature of the intellectual property law landscape". The holder of an intellectual property right such as a copyrighted work, a trademark, or a patent, may send the cease and desist letter to inform a third party "of the right holders' rights, identity, and intentions to enforce the rights". The letter may merely contain a licensing offer or may be an explicit threat of a lawsuit. A cease and desist letter often triggers licensing negotiations, and is a frequent first step towards litigation.

Effects on recipients

Receiving numerous cease and desist letters may be very costly for the recipient. Each claim in the letters must be evaluated, and it should be decided whether to respond to the letters, "whether or not to obtain an attorney's opinion letter, prepare for a lawsuit, and perhaps initiate [in case of letters regarding a potential patent infringement] a search for alternatives and the development of design-around technologies".

Cease and desist letters are sometimes used to intimidate recipients and can be "an effective tool used by corporations to chill the critical speech of gripe sites operators". A company owning a trademark may send such letter to a gripe site operator alleging a trademark infringement, although the actual use of the trademark by the gripe site operator may fall under a fair use exception (in compliance with, in the U.S., the protection of free speech under the First Amendment).

Notable cease and desist letters

2010s
Author Patrick Wensink used Jack Daniel's famous branding without licensing as a cover for his 2012 book Broken Piano for President. Jack Daniel's requested only future printing of the book to have the cover changed and offered compensation.

In 2017, a cease and desist letter sent by Netflix for an unauthorized Stranger Things-related bar event was noted by news outlets such as Fortune and Quartz for its humorous wording.

2020s

The Philippine National Telecommunications Commission issued a cease and desist letter ordering ABS-CBN to stop broadcasting on May 5, 2020 after its franchise expired the day before (May 4, 2020). At 7:52 pm (PHT), ABS-CBN stopped its broadcast in compliance with the NTC's letter, signing off all of its free TV and radio stations across the country (ABS-CBN Channel 2, S+A Channel 23, DZMM 630, and MOR 101.9). The said agency also gave ABS-CBN ten days to explain why its assigned frequencies should not be recalled. On June 30, 2020, considering that Channel 43 was also included in the May 5, 2020 shutdown order issued by the NTC against ABS-CBN (although ABS-CBN CEO Carlo Katigbak insisted that it is part of their blocktime agreement with AMCARA Broadcasting Network), the NTC and Solicitor General Jose Calida released two alias shutdown orders against Channel 43 on digital receiver ABS-CBN TV Plus and Sky Cable's nationwide satellite service Sky Direct.

Donald Trump sent a cease and desist letter to CNN asking them to retract a poll that showed him being 14 percentage points behind his opponent Joe Biden during the presidential election, prompting The Atlantic to warn about attacks on the media.

In 2021, Google's platform YouTube issued a significant number of cease and desist notices to the creators of various music bots on Discord, such as Rythm and Groovy. These music bots allowed users to request songs and have the bot create a queue. This was done by pulling the audio stream from various streaming and video platforms, including YouTube, and then played that audio on the Discord voice channel. Because such music bots did not play any of the advertisements included on the video-hosting site, the company alleged missing revenue for itself and the content uploaders. A spokesperson for Google told The Verge that Groovy violated YouTube's terms of service for "modifying the service and using it for commercial purposes". The makers of Groovy had decided to comply with Google's request by shutting down the bot on August 30, 2021. According to estimations, the bot had more than 250 million users.

In 2022, Disney issued a letter of cease and desist to the creators of Club Penguin Rewritten, a game that was created as a remake of Club Penguin after its shutdown on March 31, 2017.

Google issued a letter of cease and desist to the creators of YouTube Vanced, an Android app developed as a third-party modification of YouTube. The app allowed its users to skip advertisements, among other functions. Since March 13, 2022, the app has been discontinued, with all links being removed.

See also
 Abmahnung, the equivalent of a cease and desist letter in German and Austrian law
 Lumen (formerly known as Chilling Effects), a collaborative archive to protect lawful online activity from legal threats such as cease and desist letters
 ABS-CBN franchise renewal controversy, a national dispute in the Philippines regarding the ABS-CBN franchise renewal which involved a cease and desist letter
 Clameur de haro
 Demand letter
 Legal threat
 Online Copyright Infringement Liability Limitation Act
 Strategic lawsuit against public participation (SLAPP)

References

External links
 Chillingeffects.org—A joint project between the Electronic Frontier Foundation and several universities to monitor uses and abuses of intellectual property rights on the internet. Contains a database of cease-and-desist letters to which either senders or recipients can contribute.
 

Legal terminology
Letters (message)